Ramón Concepción Ramos (February 5, 1905 – December 4, 1967), nicknamed "Monchile", was a Puerto Rican outfielder in the Negro leagues between 1929 and 1934.

A native of San Juan, Puerto Rico, Concepción made his Negro leagues debut in 1929 with the Lincoln Giants. He went on to play for the Cuban Stars (East) and the Bacharach Giants. Concepción died in San Juan in 1967 at age 62.

References

External links
 and Baseball-Reference Black Baseball stats and Seamheads

1905 births
1967 deaths
Bacharach Giants players
Cuban Stars (East) players
Lincoln Giants players
Puerto Rican baseball players
Baseball outfielders
Sportspeople from San Juan, Puerto Rico